Puzzled Pint is a monthly, casual, social puzzle solving event. It is held every second Tuesday in 50+ cities around the world, with every location using the same puzzles. The global monthly attendance exceeds 3000. It follows the pattern of a conference-room style puzzle hunt, with teams receiving packets of 4-5 puzzles, usually with the answers feeding into a final Metapuzzle.

Most cities rotate the location to a new bar every month. The Friday before each event, a location puzzle is posted to the website. Solving this puzzle will lead players to that month's “secret” location.

Puzzled Pint is a not-for-profit, volunteer-run event, with a goal of introducing new players to the world of puzzlehunts. The emphasis is on the casual nature of the evening. The puzzles are not as advanced or numerous as day-long or weekend puzzle events, and hints are always free. An archive of all previous puzzles is on the website and available under a flexible Creative Commons license so that they may be repurposed for other events and activities.

History

 Puzzled Pint was originally 5 people in July 2010 in Portland, Oregon; that city now sees a regular attendance of at least 100 players. 
 It expanded to include Seattle in October 2012. 
 Additional cities have been added over the years, to the current count of 60 locations and 3113 players in August 2018.

Themes
Puzzled Pint has had a theme every month since September 2010. The first two months had puzzles with no common theme.
 2010
 July: None
 August: None
 September: Pirates
 October: Brewing beer
 November: Fantasy video games
 December: Lesser-known holidays
 2011
 January: Sports
 February: A blind date
 March: William Shakespeare
 April: Condiments
 May: Games
 June: Flags
 July: A pub crawl to celebrate the first anniversary
 August: Round things
 September: Space
 October: An exam
 November: Political campaigning
 December: A Christmas party
 2012
 January: Calendars
 February: Wedding planning
 Note: This was a sequel to the February 2011 Puzzled Pint.
 March: The wedding itself
 Note: This was the first Puzzled Pint to continue on from the previous month.
 April: Time travel
 May: Water safety
 June: Bicycles
 July: A birthday party
 August: The WarTron Game
 Note: No puzzles are available online.
 September: The number 8
 October: Dogs
 November: Webcomics
 Note: The first Puzzled Pint to include a Bonus Puzzle that could optionally be solved.
 December: Star Wars
 2013
 January: The apocalypse
 February: The board game Clue
 March: Jeopardy!
 April: Marijuana
 May: Arrested Development
 June: Twin Peaks
 July: Spies
 August: Magazines
 September: Pub Games
 October: Sherlock Holmes
 November: The five senses
 December: The Hitchhiker's Guide to the Galaxy
 2014
 January: Transportation
 February: This Is Spinal Tap
 March: Casino games
 April: A mixtape
 May: The Princess Bride
 June: The Doubleclicks
 July: Monty Python and the Holy Grail
 August: Moving day
 September: Words that kind of sound like "sex"
 October: Back to the Future
 November: Ancient Egypt
 December: Holiday traditions
 2015
 January: The X-Men
 February: Phobias
 March: Mythology
 April: The A-Team
 May: Robotics
 Note: Based on puzzles from JoCo Crazy Cruise 5.
 June: TV Shows
 July: The city of Portland, Oregon
 August: Semaphore
 September: Doctor Who (using ClueKeeper)
 October: None, just a mystery theme.
 November: The Big Lebowski
 December: The TV show "Mad Men"
 2016
 January: A crime scene
 February: The poems of Shel Silverstein
 March: A comic book mystery
 April: Queens
 May: Parks And Recreation
 June: A brewery tour
 July: Secret societies
 August: The "Star Trek" series
 September: Rats
 October: Elections
 November: Voting results
 Note: Was held a week later due to the U.S. elections.
 December: Dungeons And Dragons
 2017
 January: The musical "Hamilton"
 February: Valentine's Day
 March: The book "Alice's Adventures In Wonderland"
 April: Playing cards
 May: The newspaper
 June: The Prisoner
 July: Game of Thrones
 August: Destiny
 September: "Romeo and Juliet" by William Shakespeare
 October: Dracula
 November: Charlie And The Chocolate Factory
 December: Secret messages and codes
 2018
 January: Stranger Things
 February: Stargate
 March: Harry Potter
 April: Cryptocurrencies
 May: Ampersand
 June: Road trips
 July: Kangaroo
 August: Pokémon
 September: Labyrinth
 October: Zoo Theft
 November: Leonardo da Vinci
 December: The Nightmare Before Christmas
 2019
 January: Friends
 February: Planning an art heist
 March: The Dark Crystal
 April: Rivalries
 May: High school
 June: The Crystal Maze
 July: The space race
 August: The Muppet Show
 September: Dimensions
 October: Haunted House
 November: Music
 December: Die Hard
 2020
 January: Neko Atsume
 February: Circles
 March: Gangsters
 April: Magic
 Note: Due to Coronavirus concerns, all the puzzles began being posted online on event dates starting with this one. This stayed until the end of 2022, when puzzles were posted online the day after each event.
 May: Dr. Seuss
 June: Modern Board Games
 July: Puzzled Pint's 10th Anniversary
 August: The Great British Baking Show
 September: Schoolhouse Rock
 October: The four seasons
 November: Scooby-Doo
 December: The Grinch
 2021
 January: BuzzFeed
 February: A Series Of Unfortunate Events
 March: Life in 2020
 April: Greek mythology
 May: Steven Universe
 June: Chess
 July: Hercule Poirot
 August: Vikings
 September: Tenet
 October: Condiments
 November: The Seven Wonders of the Ancient World
 December: Gilligan's Island
 2022
 January: Avatar: The Last Airbender
 February: Spiritfarer
 March: Internet shopping
 April: Studio Ghibli
 May: Dogs
 June: The Jurassic Park and Jurassic World movies
 July: Squid Game
 August: The Expanse
 September: The Seven Deadly Sins
 October: Punctuation marks
 November: The World Cup
 December: Cats

References

External links
 Puzzled Pint

Puzzle hunts